The Refugee Team will participate in the 2017 Asian Indoor and Martial Arts Games which take place in Ashgabat, Turkmenistan from 17-27 September 2017.

The five athletes will compete under the Olympic Council of Asia flag as the "Refugee Team". Three of the athletes competed at the 2016 Summer Olympics with the remaining two competing internationally for the first time. All athletes are from South Sudan with most of them from the Kakuma Refugee Camp in Kenya.

The organizers of the games invited the team to compete. Tegla Loroupe of Kenya will serve as the delegation's chef de mission.

Participants 
5 competitors competed in the Indoor Athletics under the flag of Refugee Team.

See also
Refugee Olympic Team at the 2016 Summer Olympics
South Sudan at the 2016 Summer Olympics

References

External links
Refugee Team Profile at the 2017 Asian Indoor and Martial Arts Games Official Website

Nations at the 2017 Asian Indoor and Martial Arts Games